Statistics of Emperor's Cup in the 1956 season.

Overview
It was contested by 16 teams, and Keio BRB won the championship.

Results

1st Round
Kwangaku Club 8–0 Tomioka Soccer
Hamamatsu Soccer 0–4 Keio BRB
All Muroran 0–7 Toyo Industries
All Rikkyo 2–1 Tohoku Gakuin University
Urawa Club 1–1 (lottery) All Kansai University
Chuo University Club 2–1 Kyoto Shiko
Osaka Club 5–1 Ueda Club
University of Tokyo LB 1–6 Yawata Steel

Quarterfinals
Kwangaku Club 1–2 Keio BRB
Toyo Industries 1–0 All Rikkyo
All Kansai University 1–3 Chuo University Club
Osaka Club 1–1 (lottery) Yawata Steel

Semifinals
Keio BRB 3–0 Toyo Industries
Chuo University Club 2–2 (lottery) Yawata Steel

Final

Keio BRB 4–2 Yawata Steel
Keio BRB won the championship.

References
 NHK

Emperor's Cup
1956 in Japanese football